The  was developed by the Avionics and Supersonic Aerodynamics (AVSA) research group in the early days of the Japanese space program.  A prominent engineer on the project was Hideo Itokawa.  The rocket was first launched on 12 April 1955.  The dimensions were 23 cm in length by 1.8 cm in diameter, weighing 200 grams.

Development of the Pencil rocket system started in 1954 when Hideo Itokawa formed a center for rocket development at the University of Tokyo. In 1955, Itokawa's team, began conducting experimental launches of pencil-type rockets. The team launched 29 rockets over their course of these first experiments in space launch. Afterwards, the team expanded its focus to atmospheric observation with the larger Kappa 6 rocket.

Japan donated a full-scale replica of the Pencil test rocket to the U.S. National Air and Space Museum in 1974.

References

External links

Space program of Japan
Japanese inventions